Yevgeni Nikolayevich Kuznetsov (born 2 December 1983) is a Russian former footballer.

External links
  Player page on the official Luch-Energiya website
 

1983 births
Sportspeople from Nizhny Novgorod
Living people
Russian footballers
Association football midfielders
FC Dynamo Moscow reserves players
FC Chernomorets Novorossiysk players
FC Luch Vladivostok players
FC Shinnik Yaroslavl players
Russian Premier League players
FC Baltika Kaliningrad players
FC Volga Nizhny Novgorod players
FC Khimki players
FC Fakel Voronezh players